Phragmataecia geisha is a species of moth of the family Cossidae. It is found in Japan.

References

Moths described in 2011
Phragmataecia